This is a list of municipalities in the former county of Hordaland, Norway. Hordaland, until 1919 known as Søndre Bergenhus amt, was divided into 33 municipalities prior to 2020 when the county was merged into Vestland county. Traditionally, the county was divided into five districts: Hardanger, Voss, Sunnhordland, Midhordland, and Nordhordland.  These districts do not have separate administrations and have no political powers. The municipality and city of Bergen, a separate county until 1972, is the county capital of Hordaland.

References

Vestland